is a field hockey player from Japan, who finished in ninth place with the Men's National Team at the 2006 Men's Hockey World Cup in Mönchengladbach. Before the start of the tournament he played 30 international matches for his native country, according to the official players list issued by the International Field Hockey Federation (FIH) just before the start of the tournament.

References
 2006 Hockey World Cup

1980 births
Living people
Japanese male field hockey players
Place of birth missing (living people)
Field hockey players at the 2002 Asian Games
Field hockey players at the 2006 Asian Games
2006 Men's Hockey World Cup players
Asian Games competitors for Japan
21st-century Japanese people